Henry Rolle  is a Bahamian former athlete and Head Coach at Puma MVP International professional running group based in Boca Raton, Florida. MVP International is a branch off club from the MVP Jamaica Group that has coached Elaine Thompson, Shelly-Ann Fraser-Pryce and Asafa Powell.

He coached St. John's College High School in Nassau, Bahamas before going to the States to serve as an assistant coach at Oral Roberts University.
Rolle then went on to serve as the assistant Head coach at Auburn University for twenty years. He is now the Puma SE representative for the Caribbean.

Rolle has coached 31 Olympians, 13 World Championship Medalists, Seven Commonwealth Games Medalists, 18 NCAA Champions, and 40 SEC Champions.
He also served as Assistant coach for The Bahamas at the 2004 Olympic Games, 2012 Olympic Games and 2016 Olympic Games.

See also
List of Auburn University people

References

External links
 Auburn Bio
 Linkedin
 Puma Bahamas Interview

Living people
People from Freeport, Bahamas
People from West Grand Bahama
Bahamian male sprinters
Bahamian male high jumpers
Auburn University alumni
Bahamian sports coaches
Athletics (track and field) coaches
Auburn University faculty
Year of birth missing (living people)